Maria Victoria Sanchez (born November 26, 1989) is a former tennis player from the United States. In July 2013, she reached her career-high singles ranking of world No. 107. On 22 April 2019, she peaked at No. 51 of the WTA doubles ranking. Sanchez has been primarily a doubles player. In doubles, she won three WTA titles, one WTA 125 title, and 24 ITF titles. She also won two ITF singles titles.

College
Sanchez attended the University of Southern California where she was a three-time All-American in singles and doubles. She was the No. 1 collegiate player throughout the 2011–2012 season and was named the ITA Senior Player of the Year. While at USC, star quarterback Matt Barkley was quoted as saying that Sanchez was his favorite athlete on campus.

Career

2012
In her first full season on tour, Sanchez climbed over 530 spots in the world rankings. She captured the Gold River Challenger $50k title in Northern California, defeating Jessica Pegula in a three-set final. The win marked her first pro title. Sanchez quickly added a second title at the Coleman Vision Championships $75k event in Albuquerque, New Mexico in September, where she defeated American teenager Lauren Davis, 6–1, 6–1.

2021: Last match
Sanchez competed her last pro match in July 2021 at the WTA 125 event in Charleston, where she lost her quarterfinal match in the doubles draw.

Doubles performance timeline

WTA career finals

Doubles: 5 (3 titles, 2 runner-ups)

WTA 125 tournament finals

Doubles: 2 (1 title, 1 runner-up)

ITF Circuit finals

Singles: 8 (2 titles, 6 runner-ups)

Doubles: 44 (24 titles, 20 runner-ups)

External links
 
 
 Articles about Maria Sanchez at Tennis Grandstand

1989 births
Living people
American female tennis players
University of Southern California alumni
Sportspeople from Boca Raton, Florida
Tennis people from California
USC Trojans women's tennis players